Beta-1,3-glucosyltransferase is an enzyme that in humans is encoded by the B3GALTL gene.

References

External links
  GeneReviews/NCBI/NIH/UW entry on Peters Plus Syndrome
  OMIM entries on Peters Plus syndrome

Further reading